The 1924 New Zealand tour rugby to New South Wales was the 11th tour by the New Zealand national rugby union team to Australia. 

During the First World War the activity of Rugby Union was suspended. In Australia, the sport was initially reprised only in New South Wales (many players switched to Rugby league especially in Queensland), so official test matches between the two national sides were not resumed until 1929. 

The three most important matches were played against the New South Wales selection, and New Zealand won the 3 match series 2–1. In 1986 the Australian Rugby Union accorded Test status to the New South Wales matches played against international teams in the 1920–1928 period, but the matches against the All Blacks are not recorded as Tests by the New Zealand Rugby Union.

After this short tour, New Zealand played matches in own country against two provincial selections.

Matches 
'Scores and results list New Zealand's points tally first.

Post-tour matches 
Scores and results list All Blacks' points tally first.

Notes

References

External links
 New Zealand in new South Wales 1924 from rugbymuseum.co.nz

New Zealand
New Zealand tour
Australia tour
New Zealand national rugby union team tours of Australia